The United States Road Racing Championship (USRRC) was created by the Sports Car Club of America in 1962.  It was the first SCCA series for professional racing drivers.  SCCA Executive Director John Bishop helped to create the series to recover races that had been taken by rival USAC Road Racing Championship, a championship that folded after the 1962 season.  For its first three seasons, the series featured both open-topped sports cars and GT cars.  Ford and Porsche dominated the Over- and Under-2 Liter classes, respectively.  The USRRC ran from 1963 until 1968 when it was abandoned in favor of the more successful Can-Am series, which was also run by the SCCA.

In 1998 the USRRC name was revived by the SCCA as an alternative to the IMSA GT Championship, and revived the Can-Am name for its top class.  For 1999 the series reached an agreement with the International Sports Racing Series in Europe, in which the two series would share the same rules for prototypes.  Entries for the series were sparse, and the final two rounds were cancelled.  At the end of 1999 the series was taken over by the new Grand American Road Racing Association (GARRA), and the championship was reborn as the Grand American Road Racing Championship, known as the Rolex Sports Car Series. In 2014 the Grand American Road Racing Association and American Le Mans Series merged to form the WeatherTech SportsCar Championship

Champions

USRRC champions

References

External links
 USRRC season results

 
Sports Car Club of America
Sports car racing series
Auto racing series in the United States